The following is a list of destinations served by Air Wisconsin as of September 2020 with the airline operating as United Express on behalf of United Airlines with all flights being operated with Canadair Regional Jets. In light of the COVID-19 pandemic, Air Wisconsin's route network has been temporarily reduced.
Historical destinations served by Air Wisconsin as an independent air carrier in 1965, 1972, and 1985, as well as 2013 when they were flying for US Airways Express are listed below this section.

Current Destinations

Historical destinations

Destinations in 1965

According to its August 23, 1965 timetable, Air Wisconsin, which was a new commuter airline at the time, was only serving two destinations:

Appleton, WI – Home base and headquarters
Chicago, IL (O'Hare Airport)

The airline was flying nine-seat de Havilland Dove twin prop commuter aircraft at this time as an independent commuter air carrier and was operating four round-trip flights every weekday and two round-trip flights on Saturdays and Sundays between Appleton and Chicago.

Destinations in 1972

According to its June 15, 1972 route map, Air Wisconsin was serving the following destinations in the U.S. as an independent commuter air carrier:

Appleton, WI
Chicago, IL (O'Hare International Airport) – Hub
Elkhart, IN
Indianapolis, IN
Kokomo, IN
Lafayette, IN (Purdue University Airport)
Marion, IN/Wabash, IN
Minneapolis/Saint Paul, MN
Sheboygan, WI
Wausau, WI/Stevens Point, WI (Central Wisconsin Airport)

According to the Official Airline Guide (OAG), Air Wisconsin was operating two small commuter turboprop aircraft types at this time being the de Havilland Canada DHC-6 Twin Otter and Swearingen Metro.

Destinations in 1985

According to its June 1, 1985 route map, Air Wisconsin was serving the following destinations in the U.S. as an independent regional airline.  Those destinations served with jet aircraft are noted in bold.

Akron/Canton, OH
Appleton, WI
Battle Creek, MI
Benton Harbor, MI
Bridgeport, CT
Cedar Rapids, IA
Chicago, IL (O'Hare Airport) – Hub
Cleveland, OH
Dubuque, IA
Elkhart, IN
Flint, MI
Fort Wayne, IN
Grand Island, NE 
Green Bay, WI
Kalamazoo, MI
Lafayette, IN
La Crosse, WI
Lincoln, NE
Madison, WI
Milwaukee, WI
Minneapolis/Saint Paul, MN
Moline, IL/Quad Cities
Muskegon, MI
New Haven, CT
Oshkosh, WI
Peoria, IL
South Bend, IN
Springfield, IL
Toledo, OH
Waterloo, IA

According to the Official Airline Guide (OAG), at this time in 1985 Air Wisconsin was operating two different jet aircraft types, being the British Aerospace BAe 146-200 and British Aircraft Corporation BAC One-Eleven, as well as one turboprop aircraft type, being the de Havilland Canada DHC-7 Dash 7.

By the late spring of 1986, Air Wisconsin had added Allentown/Bethlehem, Easton, PA, Rhinelander, WI, Richmond, VA, Traverse City, MI, Washington Dulles International Airport and Wausau/Stevens Point, WI to its route system.

Destinations in 2013 flying as US Airways Express
Canada
Ottawa, ON (Macdonald–Cartier International Airport)
Toronto, ON (Toronto Pearson International Airport)
Montreal, QC (Montréal–Trudeau International Airport)
Quebec City, QC

United States of America
Birmingham, AL
Huntsville, AL
Hartford, CT
Washington, D.C. (Ronald Reagan Washington National Airport) – Domicile and Hub 
Daytona Beach, FL
Fort Walton Beach, FL
Jacksonville, FL
Pensacola, FL
Sarasota, FL
Atlanta, GA
Augusta, GA
Savannah, GA
Fort Wayne, IN
Indianapolis, IN
Lexington, KY
Louisville, KY
Bangor, ME
Portland, ME
Baltimore, MD
Boston, MA
Martha's Vineyard, MA
Nantucket, MA
Detroit, MI
Grand Rapids, MI
Gulfport, MS
Jackson, MS
Kansas City, MO
St Louis, MO
Minneapolis, MN
Manchester, NH
Albany, NY
Buffalo, NY
Elmira, NY
Ithaca, NY
Islip, NY
New York, NY (LaGuardia Airport) – Domicile 
Newburgh, NY
Rochester, NY
Syracuse, NY
White Plains, NY
Asheville, NC
Charlotte, NC
Fayetteville, NC
Greensboro, NC
Jacksonville, NC
New Bern, NC
Raleigh/Durham, NC
Wilmington, NC
Cincinnati, OH (Cincinnati/Northern Kentucky International Airport) 
Cleveland, OH
Columbus, OH
Allentown, PA
Harrisburg/York, PA
Philadelphia, PA –  Domicile, Hub and Maintenance base
Pittsburgh, PA
Scranton, PA
State College, PA
Providence, RI
Charleston, SC
Columbia, SC – Maintenance base 
Florence, SC
Greenville/Spartanburg, SC
Myrtle Beach, SC
Bristol/Kingsport/Johnson City, TN
Chattanooga, TN
Knoxville, TN
Memphis, TN
Nashville, TN
Burlington, VT
Charlottesville, VA
Lynchburg, VA
Newport News, VA
Norfolk, VA – Domicile and Maintenance base 
Richmond, VA
Roanoke, VA
Milwaukee, WI – Maintenance base

References

Air Wisconsin